Systasea pulverulenta, the Texas powdered skipper, is a butterfly of the family Hesperiidae. It is found in North America from southern and western Texas, south through Mexico to Guatemala in Central America.

Adults are on wing from February to December in southern Texas.

The larvae feed on various Malvaceae species. Adults feed on flower nectar.

External links
Butterflies and Moths of North America

Pyrgini
Butterflies of North America
Butterflies described in 1869
Taxa named by Rudolf Felder
Butterflies of Central America